Nguyễn Ngọc Bích Ngân (born 16 September 1973 in Mỹ Tho) is a Vietnamese-Canadian singer, songwriter, artist and writer. Beside being a performer, Ngoc Bich Ngan is also a writer and essayist at many Vietnamese national newspapers such as Thoi Bao Tap Chi Ca Dao, Thoi Moi media and many more. She was baptized a Catholic and has the Christian name Martha, St. Therese of the Infant Jesus.

Early life

Born as the sixth and last child to her father Phan-Xi-Cô Nguyễn Trọng Nghĩa and her mother Maria Nguyễn Thị Triêm, Ngoc Bich Ngan came to Canada with family in 1979. In 1981, she won the First Award of Golden Voice organized at Theatre 'Le Plateau' in Montreal, by the Montreal Chapter of the Vietnamese Canadian Association for young people under 14 years old. In her childhood education, Ngoc Bich Ngan studied and graduated from Montreal's private schools College Marie de France and Couvent Pensionnat du St. Nom de Marie. European and Religious inspiration & passions of the culture and education of these 'lycées' have appeared in Ngoc Bich Ngan’s soul and heart through her lyrics, her songs, her writings and her life.

Career
From 1981 to 1999, Ngan started her career as singer and songwriter in Montreal where she was hailed by Thoi Bao journalist Truong Ky as "one of the Vietnamese Canadian fastest rising stars in music and art". Some of the songs she has composed in Vietnamese are: Cung Thứ, Đàn Yêu, Giọt Buồn Thiếu Phụ, Nói Cùng Gió Xuân, Hoa Lòng Của Bé Mục Đồng, Cô Đơn, Đoàn Thanh Niên, Mộng Tuyết, Đêm Băng Giá, Chuyện Cây Thông.

As a devout Roman Catholic, together with other worldwide Catholic performers as well-known singer Khánh-Ly, famous MC Nguyễn Ngọc Ngạn, Ngoc Bich Ngan has participated as a volunteer singer and worker at World Youth Day from July 24 – 27, 2002, to welcome Pope John Paul II to Toronto, Ontario, Canada.

In her English-French-Vietnamese Album, Ngoc Bich Ngan has chosen to rewrite herself the beautiful meanings and denotations of some popular English and French songs into Vietnamese lyrics.

In the early Summer 2010, Ngoc Bich Ngan founded the Vòm Trời (Vault of Ether) Magazine where she is also its Editor in Chief.
 
On June 30, 2010, the first edition of the new Trilingual Magazine, Edition: Summer 2010, was published and released in Montreal, Toronto and California. The purpose of the Magazine is first to promote literature, poetry, music and art with interesting and educational articles addressing the issues relevant to today living supported by creatively artistic design and layout. Second, it provides an entrepreneurial medium of effective communications for Canadian businesses and professionals.

As reported in several interviews, one of Ngoc Bich Ngan's several projects is to translate hundred of her published novels, articles, stories and love-songs into English so she will have a chance to convey her messages about True-love to more readers and music’s listeners worldwide.

Albums

Cung Thứ (The Sad Minor Key): Love and Romantic Songs. (Vietnamese) The Drizzle The Ocean Recalls
Đêm Băng Giá (That Frosty Night): Canticles & Christmas Songs. (French, Vietnamese)
Những Cánh Sóng (The Wavelets of Love): Soft and Melodious Songs (English, French & Vietnamese) Scarborough Fair...

Published Novels and Short Stories
Thời Báo (ThoiBao-info) – with the following columns: Knowledge - Aesthetics - Music - Living – Society, Woman’s Corner; Poetry & Short Story

Tap Chi Ca Dao (TapchiCa Dao) – with the following columns : Do You Know?/ Knowledge – Aesthetics & Poetry - Woman's Corner

Composed Songs
Cung Thứ, Đàn Yêu
Giọt Buồn Thiếu Phụ
Nói Cùng Gió Xuân
Hoa Lòng Của Bé Mục Đồng
Cô Đơn, Đoàn Thanh Niên
Mộng Tuyết
Đêm Băng Giá
Chuyện Cây Thông

Articles written by Ngoc Bich Ngan
 At Phố Việt Newspaper Quỳ Bên Hang Đá Lộ Thiên - By NBN (Poem: Kneeling Beside The Outdoor St-Crib).
At ThoiBao Media:MICHELANGELO - by NBNWolfgang Amadeus Mozart - NBNFrédéric Chopin - by NBN.
At Tap Chi Ca Giao:Kelly Grace - by NBN.
At Thoi Moi media:Elvis Aaron Presley - by NBN.
At a Catholic online Magazine:Xuan Tan Ty Nam Nay - by NBN.

Sources
Ngoc Bich Ngan's Biography: NBN biography.
Pho Viet Newspaper - Vietnamville Online News
Đặng Hiếu Sinh (2002). The Editor of Tap chi Ca Dao Magazine: Article in English:The Little Flower.
Nguyen Vu Van, member of The Vietnamese Writers Abroad P.E.N Centre. The Poet-Singer Lady Article in English
Thoi Bao Media (2003). Published in Toronto & Montreal, Quebec, Canada - #931,Jan 2003.
Truong Ky (2000). Tuyen Tap Nghe Si #4 - Published Worldwide - Year 1999 & 2000.
Tap chi Ca Dao Magazine (2003). Published in Texas, USA - #63,02 Aug 2

References

External links
Official website of Ngoc Bich Ngan: http://www.ngocbichngan.com
Vom Troi/Vault of Ether "Trilingual" Magazine
Writer-Poet Nguyen Vu Van
Musician-Artist Hoang Minh
ThânHữuĐồngCông
ThoiBao-info
TapchiCa Dao

1973 births
Living people
Vietnamese Roman Catholics
21st-century Vietnamese women singers
Vietnamese record producers
Vietnamese emigrants to Canada
People from Mỹ Tho
20th-century Vietnamese women singers
Vietnamese women record producers